Santos Ision Jackson Zingale (1908–1999) was an American artist known for his regionalist and social realist paintings.

Biography 
Santos Zingale was born in Milwaukee, Wisconsin in 1908 to Sicilian immigrant parents. He attended Lincoln High School in Milwaukee, as well as Milwaukee State Teacher's College. In the 1930s, he shared studio space with Alfred Sessler in the Plankinton Building in Milwaukee. Between 1931 and 1934 he taught art at Milwaukee County Day School and the Young Pioneers School. In 1937, Zingale was an officer of the Wisconsin Artists Federation as well as a member of Wisconsin Painters and Sculptors. During the Depression, he participated in arts projects that were part of the New Deal, including the Public Works of Art Project and the Federal Art Project. At this time he notably created murals for the Sturgeon Bay Post Office and the Henry Mitchell High School in Racine, Wisconsin.

In 1943, he received his Masters of Education from the University of Wisconsin-Madison under the advisement of painter John Stewart Curry. From 1944 to 1946, Zingale served in the United States Navy aboard the  where he is also known to have produced several sketches of his fellow service members in their daily life. Following his time in the Navy, he became a professor of art at the University of Wisconsin-Madison until his retirement in 1978.

Zingale died in Madison, Wisconsin in 1999.

Themes and style 

Santos Zingale was known for depicting rural and urban social landscapes of the 20th century. Zingale was concerned with the destruction of Milwaukee’s old neighborhoods, creating emotionally captivating images documenting the people, streets and city of his family neighborhood. His work in the 1930s was political, looking at social themes from conditions of African Americans to people fleeing the Spanish Civil War. Zingale was labeled as a "radical artist" by the press and in 1935 he wrote, "Art must help the development of human consciousness and improve the social order".
Zingale’s major works are representational, though arguably not realist. His early scenes of urban realism used strong contrast of light and dark. Later he produced colorful, surrealist paintings that were part fact and part fantasy. Color, design and painted surfaces were major concerns in his practice.

Notable collections 
 Milwaukee Art Museum
 Museum of Wisconsin Art
 Wisconsin Veterans Museum
 Racine Art Museum
 Chazen Museum of Art
 University of Wisconsin-Milwaukee
 Marquette University

References

Further reading 
 Lewis Historical Publishing Co. Wisconsin : Stability, Progress, Beauty. 1946.
 University of Wisconsin. University Extension Division. Arts in Society., 1958.
 Clark, Laurie Beth, Hove, Arthur, and Elvehjem Art Center. University of Wisconsin-Madison, Department of Art, Sesquicentennial Celebration Faculty Exhibition : 30 January through 21 March 1999, Elvehjem Museum of Art. 1999.
 Elvehjem Museum of Art. University of Wisconsin-Madison Department of Art Faculty Exhibition: University of Wisconsin-Madison, December 8, 1990-January 20, 1991, 1990.
 Charles Allis Art Museum. Self Portraits : Wisconsin Artists. 1997.
 West Bend Art Museum, and Museum of Wisconsin Art. Wisconsin Painters & Sculptors, Wisconsin Artists in All Media : Centennial Exhibition / West Bend Art Museum. Wisconsin Art History. 2000.
 West Bend Art Museum. Foundations of Art in Wisconsin : A Wisconsin Sesquicentennial Exhibition in Honor of the State's Founding Cultural Figures and Organizations. Wisconsin Art History. 1998.
 West Bend Art Museum. Collecting the Art of Wisconsin : The Early Years. 1996.

1908 births
1999 deaths
Artists from Milwaukee
Military personnel from Milwaukee
University of Wisconsin–Milwaukee alumni
University of Wisconsin–Madison faculty
Federal Art Project artists
American male painters
20th-century American painters
20th-century American male artists
United States Navy personnel of World War II
Public Works of Art Project artists